Tysinger is a surname. Notable people with the surname include:

Harold L. Tysinger (1917–2005), United States Navy sailor
Jim Tysinger (1921–2013), American engineer and politician

See also
Tisinger